Christian Reimering is a professional pool player from Leverkusen, Germany. Reimering reached the last-16 stage of the world championship on four occasions. He did so at the 1993, 1998, and 2010 event in nine-ball, and the 2005 WPA World Eight-ball Championship.

Reimering is a two-time winner of Euro Tour events, winning the 2005 Costa Del Sol and 2007 Italian Open.

Titles
 2005 Euro Tour Costa Del Sol Open
 2007 Euro Tour Italian Open

References

External links

German pool players
Living people
Sportspeople from Leverkusen
1971 births